Tabanus nigripes is a species of horse fly in the family Tabanidae.

Distribution
Canada, United States.

References

Tabanidae
Insects described in 1821
Taxa named by Christian Rudolph Wilhelm Wiedemann
Diptera of North America